Gende (Gendeka, Gene; also Bundi) is a Papuan language spoken in Madang Province, Papua New Guinea.

External links 
 The Stephen A. Wurm collection at Paradisec (SAW3) includes Gende materials

References

Kainantu–Goroka languages
Languages of Madang Province